Royak is a village in Dalgopol Municipality, in Varna Province, eastern Bulgaria.

A three-day national mourning was declared in Bulgaria in a memory of the nine people killed in a fire at a local nursing home on 22 November 2021 and the forty-six people killed a day later in a bus crash at Bosnek.

References

Villages in Varna Province